Captain George Vancouver is a 2000 bronze sculpture depicting George Vancouver by Jim Demetro, installed in Vancouver, Washington, United States. It cost approximately $70,000 and was funded by private donors.

See also

 2000 in art

References

External links
 Captain George Vancouver at Emporis
 Royal Navy Captain George Vancouver, Vancouver, Washington at Waymarking

2000 establishments in Washington (state)
2000 sculptures
Bronze sculptures in Washington (state)
Monuments and memorials in Vancouver, Washington
Outdoor sculptures in Vancouver, Washington
Sculptures of men in Washington (state)
Statues in Washington (state)